In cellular biology, stress granules are biomolecular condensates in the cytosol composed of proteins and RNAs that assemble into 0.1–2 μm membraneless organelles when the cell is under stress. The mRNA molecules found in stress granules are stalled translation pre-initiation complexes associated with 40S ribosomal subunits, translation initiation factors, poly(A)+ mRNAs and RNA-binding proteins (RBPs). While they are membraneless organelles, stress granules have been proposed to be associated with the endoplasmatic reticulum. Note that there are also nuclear stress granules. This article is about the cytosolic variety.

Proposed functions 

The function of stress granules remains largely unknown. Stress granules have long been proposed to have a function to protect RNAs from harmful conditions, thus their appearance under stress. The accumulation of RNAs into dense globules could keep them from reacting with harmful chemicals and safeguard the information coded in their RNA sequence.

Stress granules might also function as a decision point for untranslated mRNAs. Molecules can go down one of three paths: further storage, degradation, or re-initiation of translation. Conversely, it has also been argued that stress granules are not important sites for mRNA storage nor do they serve as an intermediate location for mRNAs in transit between a state of storage and a state of degradation.

Efforts to identify all RNAs within stress granules (the stress granule transcriptome) in an unbiased way by sequencing RNA from biochemically purified stress granule "cores" have shown that RNAs are not recruited to stress granules in a sequence-specific manner, but rather generically, with longer and/or less-optimally translated transcripts being enriched. These data imply that the stress granule transcriptome is influenced the valency of RNA (for proteins or other RNAs) and by the rates of RNA run-off from polysomes. The latter is further supported by recent single molecule imaging studies. Furthermore, it was estimated that only about 15% of the total mRNA in the cell is localized to stress granules, suggesting that stress granules only influence a minority of mRNAs in the cell and may not be as important for mRNA processing as previously thought. That said, these studies represent only a snapshot in time, and it is likely that a larger fraction of mRNAs are at one point stored in stress granules due to those RNAs transiting in and out.

The stress proteins that are the main component of stress granules in plant cells are molecular chaperones that sequester, protect, and possibly repair proteins that unfold during heat and other types of stress. Therefore, any association of mRNAs with stress granules may simply be a side effect of the association of partially unfolded RNA-binding proteins with stress granules, similar to the association of mRNAs with proteasomes.

Formation 

Environmental stressors trigger cellular signaling, eventually leading to the formation of stress granules. In vitro, these stressors can include heat, cold, oxidative stress (sodium arsenite), endoplasmic reticulum stress (thapsigargin), proteasome inhibition (MG132), hyperosmotic stress, ultraviolet radiation, inhibition of eIF4A (pateamine A, hippuristanol, or RocA), nitric oxide accumulation after treatment with 3-morpholinosydnonimine (SIN-1), perturbation of pre-mRNA splicing, and other stressors, like puromycin, which result in disassembled polysomes. Many of these stressors result in the activation of particular stress-associated kinases (HRI, PERK, PKR, and GCN2), translational inhibition and stress granule formation.

Stress granule formation is often downstream of the stress-activated phosphorylation of eukaryotic translation initiation factor eIF2α; this does not hold true for all types of stressors that induce stress granules, for instance, eIF4A inhibition. Further downstream, prion-like aggregation of the protein TIA-1 promotes the formation of stress granules. The term prion-like is used because aggregation of TIA-1 is concentration dependent, inhibited by chaperones, and because the aggregates are resistant to proteases. It has also been proposed that microtubules play a role in the formation of stress granules, perhaps by transporting granule components. This hypothesis is based on the fact that disruption of microtubules with the chemical nocodazole blocks the appearance of the granules. Furthermore, many signaling molecules have been shown to regulate the formation or dynamics of stress granules; these include the "master energy sensor" AMP-activated protein kinase (AMPK), the O-GlcNAc transferase enzyme (OGT), and the pro-apoptotic kinase ROCK1.

Potential roles of RNA-RNA interactions 
RNA phase transitions driven in part by intermolecular RNA-RNA interactions may play a role in stress granule formation. Similar to intrinsically disordered proteins, total RNA extracts are capable of undergoing phase separation in physiological conditions in vitro. RNA-seq analyses demonstrate that these assemblies share a largely overlapping transcriptome with stress granules, with RNA enrichment in both being predominately based on the length of the RNA. Further, stress granules contain many RNA helicases, including the DEAD/H-box helicases Ded1p/DDX3, eIF4A1, and RHAU. In yeast, catalytic ded1 mutant alleles give rise to constitutive stress granules ATPase-deficient DDX3X (the mammalian homolog of Ded1) mutant alleles are found in pediatric medulloblastoma, and these coincide with constitutive granular assemblies in patient cells. These mutant DDX3 proteins promote stress granule assembly in HeLa cells. In mammalian cells, RHAU mutants lead to reduced stress granule dynamics. Thus, some hypothesize that RNA aggregation facilitated by intermolecular RNA-RNA interactions plays a role in stress granule formation, and that this role may be regulated by RNA helicases. There is also evidence that RNA within stress granules is more compacted, compared to RNA in the cytoplasm, and that the RNA is preferentially post-translationally modified by N6-methyladenosine (m6A) on its 5' ends. Recent work has shown that the highly abundant translation initiation factor and DEAD-box protein eIF4A limits stress granule formation. It does so through its ability to bind ATP and RNA, acting analogously to protein chaperones like Hsp70.

Connection with processing bodies 

Stress granules and P-bodies (processing bodies) share RNA and protein components, both appear under stress, and can physically associate with one another. As of 2018, of the ~660 proteins identified as localizing to stress granules, ~11% also have been identified as processing body-localized proteins (see below). The protein G3BP1 is necessary for the proper docking of processing bodies and stress granules to each other, which may be important for the preservation of polyadenylated mRNAs.

Although some protein components are shared between stress granules and processing bodies, the majority of proteins in either structure are uniquely localized to either structure. While both stress granules and P-bodies are associated with mRNAs, processing bodies have been long proposed to be sites of mRNA degradation because they contain enzymes like DCP1/2 and XRN1 that are known to degrade mRNAs. However, others have demonstrated that mRNAs associated with processing bodies are largely translationally repressed but not degraded. It has also been proposed that mRNAs selected for degradation are passed from stress granules to processing bodies, though there is also data suggesting that processing bodies precede and promote stress granule formation.

Protein composition of stress granules  

The complete proteome of stress granules is still unknown, but efforts have been made to catalog all of the proteins that have been experimentally demonstrated to transit into stress granules. Importantly, different stressors can result in stress granules with different protein components. Many stress granule-associated proteins have been identified by transiently stressing cultured cells and utilizing microscopy to detect the localization of a protein of interest either by expressing that protein fused to a fluorescent protein (i.e. green fluorescent protein (GFP)) and/or by fixing cells and using antibodies to detect the protein of interest along with known protein markers of stress granules (immunocytochemistry).

In 2016, stress granule "cores" were experimentally identified and then biochemically purified for the first time. Proteins in the cores were identified in an unbiased manner using mass spectrometry. This technical advance lead to the identification of hundreds of new stress granule-localized proteins.

The proteome of stress granules has also been experimentally determined by using two slightly different proximity labeling approaches. One of these proximity labeling approaches is the ascorbate peroxidase (APEX) method, in which cells are engineered to express a known stress granule protein, such as G3BP1, fused to a modified ascorbate peroxidase enzyme called APEX. Upon incubating the cells in biotin and treating the cells with hydrogen peroxide, the APEX enzyme will be briefly activated to biotinylate all proteins in close proximity to the protein of interest, in this case G3BP1 within stress granules. Proteins that are biotinylated can then be isolated via streptavidin and identified using mass spectrometry. The APEX technique was used to identify ~260 stress granule-associated proteins in several cell types, including neurons, and with various stressors. Of the 260 proteins identified in this study, ~143 had not previously been demonstrated to be stress granule-associated.

Another proximity labeling method used to determine the proteome of stress granules is BioID. BioID is similar to the APEX approach, in that a biotinylating protein (BirA* instead of APEX) was expressed in cells as a fusion protein with several known stress granule-associated proteins. Proteins in close proximity to BirA* will be biotinylated and are then identified by mass spectrometry. Youn et al. used this method to identify/predict 138 proteins as stress granule-associated and 42 as processing body-associated.

A curated database of stress granule-associated proteins can be found here .

The following is a list of proteins that have been demonstrated to localize to stress granules (compiled from ):

References

Further reading 

 
 — molecular details of stress granule assembly & function

External links 
Laboratories:
 Anderson lab, post-transcriptional control & inflammatory response
 Zhou lab, neurodegenerative disease
 Morimoto lab, transcriptional regulation & heat shock
 Boccaccio lab, Staufen & stress granules

Cell biology